Mount Airy is a historic home at Davidsonville, Anne Arundel County, Maryland.  It is a two-story, cube-shaped brick Georgian-Federal style, late neo-classical dwelling with a Doric portico on a central hall plan. It was built about 1857 for James Alexis Iglehart, whose children were educated by their French tutor in the family schoolhouse. In addition to the schoolhouse, a mid-19th century frame smokehouse is also on the property.

It was listed on the National Register of Historic Places in 1973.

References

External links
, including undated photo, at Maryland Historical Trust
 Mount Airy, Mount Airy Road, State Route 424 vicinity, Davidsonville vicinity, Anne Arundel, MD at the Historic American Buildings Survey

Houses on the National Register of Historic Places in Maryland
Houses in Anne Arundel County, Maryland
Houses completed in 1857
Historic American Buildings Survey in Maryland
National Register of Historic Places in Anne Arundel County, Maryland
1857 establishments in Maryland